The Ministry of Internal Administration ( or MAI), is the Portuguese government ministry responsible for the public security, the civil defense, the electoral administration, the road traffic safety and the immigration and refugee affairs.

History 
The ministry was created in 1736 by King John V of Portugal as the Secretariat of State for the Interior Affairs of the Kingdom (Secretaria de Estado dos Negócios Interiores do Reino), later being known simply as the Ministry of the Kingdom (Ministério do Reino).

In 1910, after the establishment of the Portuguese First Republic, the ministry was renamed Ministry of the Interior (Ministério do Interior). In 1974, after the Carnation Revolution, it was again renamed, becoming the Ministry of Internal Administration.

External links

Interior
Portugal